La Vid y Barrios is a municipality located in the province of Burgos, Castile and León, Spain. According to the 2004 census (INE), the municipality has a population of 322 inhabitants. Its seat is in Zuzones.

Main sights
Santa María de La Vid (12th century), the first Praemonstratensian monastery in Spain.

References 

Municipalities in the Province of Burgos